USNS Benavidez (T-AKR-306) was a Bob Hope-class roll on roll off vehicle cargo ship of the United States Navy. She was built by Northrop Grumman Ship Systems, New Orleans and delivered to the Navy on 10 September 2003. They assigned her to the United States Department of Defense's Military Sealift Command. Benavidez is named for Medal of Honor recipient Master Sergeant Roy P. Benavidez, and is one of 11 Surge LMSRs operated by a private company under contract to the Military Sealift Command. She was assigned to the MSC Atlantic surge force and is maintained in Ready Operational Status 4. On 21 September 2022, Benavidez left service and was stricken from the Naval Vessel Register.

References

Further reading

External links

Bob Hope-class vehicle cargo ships
Auxiliary ships of the United States
2001 ships
Ships built in New Orleans